The men's 110 metre hurdles at the 2000 Summer Olympics as part of the athletics programme were held at Stadium Australia on Sunday 24 September and Monday 25 September 2000. Forty-four athletes from 31 nations competed. The maximum number of athletes per nation had been set at 3 since the 1930 Olympic Congress. The event was won by Anier Garcia of Cuba, the nation's first championship in the event and first medal in the event since 1980. Mark Crear's bronze made him the 10th man to win a second medal in the event.

Summary

After a false start eliminated nobody, on the second try the field started even. Anier Garcia accelerated his first few steps better and gained a few centimeter lead over the first barrier, which he rattled. Typically fast starting Terrence Trammell was just slightly awkward on his second step losing a slight amount of ground. Defending champion Allen Johnson was close to Garcia, and even after clobbering the first two hurdles, he was pulling even. The entire lead group hit the third hurdle, by now Johnson and Garcia had a clear lead, with Trammell a clear third place. Johnson continued to hit hurdles, losing ground to Garcia, while Mark Crear was emerging ahead of world record holder Colin Jackson by not touching his hurdles while Jackson hit hurdle 4 awkwardly enough to pull him out of contention. Johnson hit the ninth hurdle with his lead heel, not even close to getting over the hurdle. The awkwardness of riding the last hurdle down to the ground lost his forward momentum. Garcia had a metre and a half lead at the finish over Trammell, and while Crear did hit the last hurdle he was able to beat Johnson to the line for bronze.

Background

This was the 24th appearance of the event, which is one of 12 athletics events to have been held at every Summer Olympics. The top four finishers from 1996 all returned, along with one other finalist: gold medalist Allen Johnson and silver medalist Mark Crear of the United States, bronze medalist Florian Schwarthoff of Germany (who had also finished fifth in 1992), fourth-place finisher Colin Jackson of Great Britain, and seventh-place finisher Kyle Vander-Kuyp of Australia. Jackson had been in the last three finals, taking silver in 1988 and seventh in 1992. As in 1996, the favorites were Johnson and Jackson (winners of the last four world championships), though Anier Garcia of Cuba had emerged as a challenger after taking second in the 1999 worlds.

Barbados, Liberia, São Tomé and Príncipe, and Trinidad and Tobago each made their first appearance in the event. The United States made its 23rd appearance, most of any nation (having missed only the boycotted 1980 Games).

Qualification

Each National Olympic Committee was permitted to enter up to three athletes that had run 13.70 seconds or faster during the qualification period. The maximum number of athletes per nation had been set at 3 since the 1930 Olympic Congress. If an NOC had no athletes that qualified under that standard, one athlete that had run 13.85 seconds or faster could be entered.

Competition format

The competition used the four-round format previously used in 1960 and since 1988, still using the eight-man semifinals and finals used since 1964. The "fastest loser" system, also introduced in 1964, was used in the first round.

The top four runners in each of the initial six heats automatically qualified for the second round. The next eight fastest runners from across the heats also qualified. Those 32 runners competed in 4 heats in the quarterfinals, with the top four runners from each heat qualifying for the semifinals. There were two semifinals, and only the top four from each heat advanced to the final.

Records

These were the standing world and Olympic records (in seconds) prior to the 2000 Summer Olympics.

No new world or Olympic records were set during the competition. The following national records were established during the competition:

Schedule

All times are Australian Eastern Standard Time (UTC+10)

Results

Round 1

Heat 1

Heat 2

Heat 3

Heat 4

Heat 5

Heat 6

Overall results for round 1

Quarterfinals

Quarterfinal 1

Quarterfinal 2

Quarterfinal 3

Quarterfinal 4

Overall results for quarterfinals

Semifinals

Semifinal 1

Semifinal 2

Overall results for semifinals

Final

References

External links
 Source: Official Report of the 2000 Sydney Summer Olympics available at  https://web.archive.org/web/20080522105330/http://www.la84foundation.org/5va/reports_frmst.htm

Athletics at the 2000 Summer Olympics
Sprint hurdles at the Olympics
Men's events at the 2000 Summer Olympics